Vibert may refer to the following notable people:

Given name
 Vibert Douglas (1894–1988), Canadian astronomer
 Vibert Greene (born 1960), Barbadian cricketer 

Surname
 Jean-Pierre Vibert (1777–1866), French rosarian
 Jehan Georges Vibert (1840–1902), French academic painter
 Luke Vibert (born 1973), a British recording artist and producer
 Mike Vibert (born 1950), Minister for Education, Sport and Culture in Jersey
 Ronan Vibert (1964–2022), Welsh actor
 Ted Vibert (born 1938), politician in the States of Jersey